The 1946 Montenegrin Republic League was inaugural season of Montenegrin Republic League. First edition of competition was qualifying tournament for the first season of Yugoslav First League. Also, it was the very first official competition in Montenegro after the World War II. The season began in April and ended in May 1946.

Season 

During the first season, four teams played in competition. While Budućnost and Lovćen had a struggle for champions' title, Sutjeska and Arsenal had trying to avoid the last place.
Key games were matches between Budućnost and Lovćen. First match at Podgorica City Stadium won Budućnost (5-0), while second game in Cetinje was finished 2-2.
Finished as a champion of Montenegrin Republic League, Budućnost gained promotion to 1946–47 Yugoslav First League, while second-placed Lovćen played in qualifiers for the First League.

Table

Results 
Budućnost finished season without any lost game, and with only one draw, against Lovćen in Cetinje.

Qualifiers for Yugoslav First League 
While Budućnost was promoted to First Yugoslav League, Lovćen as a runner-up played in qualifiers for the top-tier. Team from Cetinje won their games in the first two legs, but failed in qualifiers' finals. Below are FK Lovćen results in the qualifiers.

See also 
 Montenegrin Republic League
 Montenegrin Republic Cup (1947–2006)
 Montenegrin clubs in Yugoslav football competitions (1946–2006)
 Montenegrin Football Championship (1922–1940)]

References 

Montenegrin Republic League